Mangelia tranquilla is a species of sea snail, a marine gastropod mollusk in the family Mangeliidae.

Description
The shell grows to a length of 2 mm, its diameter 1.5 mm.

Distribution
This marine species is found off East London, South Africa

References

External links
  Tucker, J.K. 2004 Catalog of recent and fossil turrids (Mollusca: Gastropoda). Zootaxa 682:1–1295.

Endemic fauna of South Africa
tranquilla
Gastropods described in 1958